Behram is an impact crater on the anti-Saturn hemisphere of Saturn's moon Enceladus.  Behram was first observed in Cassini images during that mission's March 2005 flyby of Enceladus.  It is located at 15.4° South Latitude, 181.0° West Longitude, and is 13.7 kilometers across.  Behram's rim overlaps that of Shakashik, suggesting that Behram formed after Shakashik.  Following formation, numerous criss-crossing fractures cut across Behram, forming canyons hundreds of meters deep along the crater's rim, as well as a region of disrupted terrain on the crater floor.  The International Astronomical Union (IAU) adopted the S. Behram designation for feature ID 14238 in 2007.

References

Impact craters on Enceladus